Pompeo Cocchi di Pier Gentile (active 1523) was an Italian painter of the Renaissance period, active in Umbria.

Biography
Born in Corciano, he was a pupil of the painter Pietro Perugino. He was admitted into the guild of painters in 1523. One of his pupils was Orsino Carota.

References

Year of birth unknown
Year of death unknown
People from Corciano
Umbrian painters
16th-century Italian painters
Italian male painters
Italian Renaissance painters